The list of shipwrecks in 2004 includes ships sunk, foundered, grounded, or otherwise lost during 2004.

January

15 January

19 January

February

2 February

5 February

12 February

13 February

16 February

23 February

March

2 March

26 March

27 March

Unknown date

April

6 April

13 April

May

10 May

22 May

23 May

June

18 June

24 June

July

12 July

14 July

15 July

22 July

24 July

30 July

August

4 August

5 August

8 August

20 August

23 August

25 August

30 August

September

13 September

16 September

October

2 October

5 October

16 October

17 October

31 October

November

5 November

10 November

13 November

14 November

20 November

23 November

December

5 December

8 December

16 December

17 December

Unknown date

References

2004
 
Ship